The 1982 Avon Championships of Kansas  was a women's tennis tournament played on indoor carpet courts at the Municipal Auditorium  in Kansas City, Missouri in the United States that was part of the 1982 Virginia Slims World Championship Series. It was the fourth edition of the tournament and was held from February 8 through February 14, 1982. First-seeded Martina Navratilova won the singles title and earned $22,000 first-prize money.

Finals

Singles
 Martina Navratilova defeated  Barbara Potter 6–2, 6–2
 It was Navratilova's 4th singles title of the year and the 59th of her career.

Doubles
 Barbara Potter /  Sharon Walsh defeated  Mary Lou Piatek /  Anne Smith 4–6, 6–2, 6–2

Prize money

References

External links
 International Tennis Federation (ITF) tournament edition details

Avon Championships of Kansas
Virginia Slims of Kansas
Avon Championships of Kansas
Avon Championships of Kansas
Avon Championships of Kansas